Aeign Zackrey Nash Victoriano Aguas (born October 10, 1998), known professionally as Nash Aguas, is a Filipino actor, businessman/entrepreneur, real-estate investor, and politician.

Career
At the age of five, Aguas made his television debut on the noontime variety show MTB, after joining the program's Batang F4 contest. In 2004, he joined ABS-CBN's talent search Star Circle Quest, where he won the title "Grand Kid Questor" and also won most of the special awards including "Darling of the Press" in the Finals Night. He was known as a mainstay in the Sunday comedy gag show Goin' Bulilit. In 2011, Aguas voiced the main character Joey Jones in the Tagalog-dubbed version of the anime series, Heroman.

In the previous years, Aguas was paired with Alexa Ilacad. They starred together in the Sunday teen sitcom show Luv U and the afternoon drama series Doble Kara. He also has a boy band group called "Gimme 5" with Joaquin Reyes, John Bermundo, Grae Fernandez and Brace Arquiza. In the 2014–2015 season, Aguas and Ilacad starred together in their first leading roles in the primetime drama series Bagito, alongside the rest of Gimme 5 members and Ella Cruz. Aguas and Ilacad was paired again in the Dreamscape Production teleserye, The Good Son along with Loisa Andalio, Jerome Ponce, Mccoy De Leon, Elisse Joson and Joshua Garcia.

In 2018, he starred in the teen suspense-thriller film, Class of 2018, opposite former Goin' Bulilit co-star Sharlene San Pedro.

In 2020, he started streaming Valorant. He also shout cast several tournaments including international championships (including Sentinels (esports) tournament) such as VCT and participated in several tournaments.

In 2021, Aguas made a comeback in TV shows by portraying the life of Apollo, a supporting character and an orphan in the series Huwag Kang Mangamba alongside several casts. In the same year, he ran for a seat in the Cavite City Council in the 2022 Elections and won.

Filmography

Awards and nominations

References

Living people
ABS-CBN personalities
Filipino male child actors
Filipino male voice actors
Lakas–CMD politicians
People from Cavite
People from Northern Samar
Singers from Cavite City
Star Circle Quest participants
Star Circle Quest winners
Star Magic personalities
1998 births
Filipino actor-politicians